Harold Frederick Furr (13 January 1887 – 23 November 1971) was an English professional footballer who played as a goalkeeper in the Football League for Leicester Fosse.

Personal life 
Furr's three brothers, George, Vic and Willie also played professional football. His sisters Amelia and Miriam married footballers William Grimes and George Payne respectively.

Career statistics

References

1887 births
1971 deaths
Sportspeople from Hitchin
English footballers
Association football goalkeepers
Hitchin Town F.C. players
Hitchin Blue Cross F.C. players
Croydon Common F.C. players
Brentford F.C. players
Leicester City F.C. players
Letchworth F.C. players
Southern Football League players
English Football League players